The Minister is an Icelandic television drama series developed by Sagafilm. It is an eight-part series that follows populist Prime Minister Benedikt Ríkarðsson (Ólafur Darri Ólafsson) as his mental illness grows and his colleagues try to keep it a secret from the nation.

References

External links

2020s Icelandic television series
Icelandic drama television series
Icelandic-language television shows
Television shows set in Iceland
RÚV original programming